Indoleon is a genus of antlions belonging to the family Myrmeleontidae.

The species of this genus are found in Central Asia.

Species:

Indoleon audax 
Indoleon barbarus 
Indoleon fluctosus 
Indoleon infestus 
Indoleon longicorpus 
Indoleon sinensis 
Indoleon tacitus 
Indoleon vartianorum

References

Myrmeleontidae